Ong Seong-wu (Hangul: 옹성우, born August 25, 1995) is a South Korean singer and actor. He is known for his participation in the survival reality show Produce 101 Season 2, where he finished in fifth place, and is a former member of the show's derivative boy group Wanna One. Following Wanna One's disbandment, Ong made his acting debut with cast At Eighteen (2019). He also established his career as a solo artist with the release of his first extended play, Layers, on March 25, 2020.

Early life 
Ong Seong-wu was born in Incheon, South Korea. He is the youngest of two children, with one elder sister. He attended Guwol Middle School, followed by Hanlim Multi Art School, graduating in 2014. He graduated from Dong Seoul University as dance and acting major. Ong also danced professionally as part of several street and B-boy dance teams during this period.

Ong was encouraged by his mother to pick up a musical instrument and started playing the drums after his sister began learning the piano. While playing the drums at a band contest in 2008, Ong was scouted as a trainee by the now-defunct entertainment company Lion Media. However, internal troubles with the company and its eventual closure lead to the delay of his debut, and contractual issues prevented him from signing with other companies for a period of time. In August 2016, he signed as an acting trainee with his current company Fantagio at the recommendation of one of his university professors.

Career

Pre-debut: Produce 101 
Despite being an acting trainee, Ong was sent as a representative by his company to participate in Produce 101 (season 2) due to his well-rounded skills in singing and dancing. He achieved an 'A' rank in the evaluations and finished in fifth place in the finale with 984,756 votes. As part of the top eleven contestants, he would go on to debut as a member of Wanna One.

Prior to his participation in Produce 101, Ong took part in a short film project Short Film Project: Beginning. The short film, titled Seong-wu Is Alright, was released on June 19, 2017. Additionally, he made a special appearance on the mobile drama Idol Fever, which aired between July 7 to July 17, 2017.

2017–2018: Wanna One 

Ong debuted as a member of the project group Wanna One on August 7, 2017. He went on to represent the group in several appearances on variety shows such as Happy Together, The Return of Superman, and Saturday Night Live Korea. He also served as a special emcee on music show broadcasts for M Countdown and Inkigayo. Ong, together with fellow group mate Kang Daniel, was cast for the pilot episode of the variety show Master Key, and was later confirmed as a fixed cast member. His appearance on the show garnered positive reactions from media outlets, receiving praise for his skillful deception of his cast mates in the psychological game-style show to net the show's biggest win thus far.

In November, Ong featured in singer Huh Gak's music video for his digital single "Only You".

In February 2018, Ong was named one of the main emcees of Show! Music Core. He subsequently left his position in September 2018. He also continued appearing on several variety shows. He appeared on Living Together in Empty Room with Kang Daniel and Kim Jae-hwan, and also became a cast member of the reality show Law of the Jungle Sabah, with his fellow group mate Ha Sung-woon, which aired from July 27, 2018, to September 21, 2018.

His contract with Wanna One ended on December 31, 2018. However, he continued to appear with the group until its official farewell concerts on January 24–27, 2019.

2019–present: Acting endeavours and solo activities 
Upon conclusion of his activities with Wanna One, Ong embarked on his first solo fan-meeting tour, titled "Eternity", in March and April 2019. On March 7, 2019, he was also named PR Ambassador of the Incheon Metropolitan City Office of Education.

As part of Pepsi and Starship Entertainment's 2019 Pepsi K-Pop Collab Project, Ong released the single "Heart Sign". The track was written by producers Flowblow, who penned Wanna One's hit debut single, "Energetic". The music video was released on June 11, 2019.

Ong made his acting debut in the later half of the year, starring as the male lead in JTBC's youth drama At Eighteen, alongside Kim Hyang-gi and Shin Seung-ho. The drama tackles some of the issues faced by youths in South Korea, such as first love, the pressures of school and parental expectation, to topics such as school violence and bullying. Ong played the role of transfer student Choi Jun-woo, who is falsely accused of school violence. He garnered many positive reviews for his emotive acting, and went on to nab several awards for the role, including Best Rookie Award and Hallyu Star Award at the Korea Drama Awards. and made Ong nominated at the 56th Baeksang Arts Awards. In the Best New Actor – Television category. Ong also recorded the song "Our Story" as part of the official soundtrack for the drama, which was released on August 8, 2019.

In January 2020, Ong kicked off his second solo fan-meeting tour, titled "We Belong". The digital single "We Belong" was released on January 9. Intended as a fan-song, Ong participated in both the lyric writing and composition of the single, and performed it on the first time during the Seoul leg of his tour on January 11.

Ong appeared on the second season of travel variety show, Traveler, with fellow actors Ahn Jae-hong and Kang Ha-neul. The variety show focused on the backpacking travels of the trio in Argentina, and began airing starting February 15. He went received much attention for his photography skills on the first episode.

Ong made his comeback as a singer with his first solo album, Layers. The EP was released on March 25, together with lead single, "Gravity". Ong took part in the composition and lyric writing of all the songs on the album, drawing his inspiration from his emotions and stories from the past year.

He also made several appearances on variety shows, including Omniscient Interfering View, as well as Master in the House, Radio Star, and Running Man. He also featured on You Hee-yeol's Sketchbook, performing his new single and displaying his drumming skills on the show's live music format.

Ong collaborated with singer Baek Ji-young on the duet "Didn't Say Anything". The ballad was released on May 12.

Ong began starring as the male lead in the JTBC drama More Than Friends, alongside Shin Ye-eun and Kim Dong-jun, playing photographer Lee Soo. The drama premiered 25 September. The song "Late Regret" was recorded and released by Ong as part of the drama's soundtrack.

Furthermore, Ong will also be making his film debut in the upcoming musical-movie, Life is Beautiful, starring Ryu Seung-ryong and Yum Jung-ah. The film will go to theatres in second half of 2022. Ong will also star in the movie, Jung's Ranch with Ryu Seung-ryong and Park Hae-joon. This will mark his second collaboration with Ryu.

In 2021, Ong has been confirmed to appear in the drama Shall We Have A Cup of Coffee? It airs on KakaoTV and is confirmed to join the Netflix film Seoul Vibe, which is expected to air in 2022. Ong appeared alongside dancer, Noze, in Lee Seung-hwan and Sunwoo Jung-a's music video for the song "How could you", released on November 18, 2021.

In 2022, Ong announced that the fan meeting 'RE:MEET' will be held for the second time in March 2022, which will be held offline and online.

Personal life

Military service 
Fantagio announced that Ong will enlist mandatory military service as an active duty soldier on April 17, 2023.

Discography

Extended plays

Singles

As lead artist

Other releases

Filmography

Film

Television series

Web series

Television shows

Awards and nominations

Notes

References

External links

 
 
 
 

1995 births
Living people
Musicians from Incheon
Produce 101 contestants
South Korean television personalities
South Korean male idols
South Korean male singers
South Korean dance musicians
21st-century South Korean singers
Reality show winners
Wanna One members
South Korean male actors
South Korean male web series actors
Swing Entertainment artists
Hanlim Multi Art School alumni
People from Incheon
Fantagio artists